Dunblane Hotel (also known as The Dunblane) is an historic building in Dunblane, Scotland. Located on Stirling Street, it is a Category C listed building built in the late 18th century.

Originally a barn, the structure was, according to Historic Environment Scotland, "rebuilt as an inn from 1820, when it was known as the Star Inn. The inn was renamed as the Railway Hotel when Dunblane railway station was opened in 1846."

See also
List of listed buildings in Dunblane

References

External links

18th-century establishments in Scotland
Listed buildings in Dunblane
Category C listed buildings in Perth and Kinross
Listed hotels in Scotland
Railway hotels in Scotland
Hotels in Stirling (council area)